This is a list of Harlequin Romance novels released in 1986.

Releases

References 

Lists of Harlequin Romance novels
1986 novels